Charles Fort is a trace italien fortification, a bastion fort with one section of the outer wall built in star fashion. It is located on the water's edge, at the southern end of the village of Summer Cove, on Kinsale harbour, County Cork, Ireland. First completed in 1682, Charles Fort was sometimes historically referred to as the "new fort" - to contrast with James' Fort (the "old fort") which had been built on the other side of Kinsale harbour before 1607. The fort is now operated as a heritage tourism site by the Heritage Ireland arm of the Office of Public Works.

History
Charles Fort was built on the site of the ruins of an earlier stronghold known as Barry Óg Castle, at Rincurran. The Ringcurran defences had featured prominently during the Siege of Kinsale in 1601.

The new fort, which is named after Charles II, was designed by the Surveyor-general Sir William Robinson - architect of the Royal Hospital Kilmainham. Additional site structures are attributed to engineer Captain Thomas Philips. The fort was built between 1677 and 1682 to a design which included elements similar to star fortifications; a layout specifically designed to resist attack by cannon. It became known as the "new fort" - to contrast with James' Fort (the "old fort") which had been built on the other side of Kinsale harbour between 1602 and 1607.
An early lighthouse was established here in the 17th century by Robert Reading, and additional works (including the development of internal "citadel" defences) were added through the 18th and 19th centuries.

The fort remained in use as a British Army barracks for two hundred years afterwards, before being relinquished by British forces following the Anglo-Irish Treaty of 1921. The fort fell out of use after being burned by retreating anti-Treaty forces during the Irish Civil War in 1922.

Architecture 
Charles Fort is an example of a pentagonally bastioned fort. The five bastions are named, in turn, the "Kinsale" (also known as the "Devil's"), the "Charles", the "Cockpit", the "Flagstaff" and the "North". The "Kinsale" and the "Charles" - the seaward bastions -  are more substantial than the other three, as it was expected that the fort would be attacked from sea.

With a focus on seaward defence, the landward and inland bastions of the fort are overlooked by higher ground. This weakness was of critical importance when the fort was subject to a 13-day siege in 1690 during the Williamite War in Ireland. John Churchill, 1st Duke of Marlborough (then 1st Earl) besieged Cork and captured Kinsale and its forts. Repairs were made following the siege.

Tourism development
The complex remained largely derelict for some time, but was named a National Monument of Ireland in 1971. Over the coming decades several sections of the fort were restored by Dúchas, the Irish heritage service. Restoration and development of the complex was later taken-over by the Office of Public Works (OPW) - including the development of an exhibition space in the former commander's quarters.

Charles Fort is one of the most visited OPW sites in the region, attracting in excess of 86,000 visitors in 2015.

Gallery

See also

 Governor of Kinsale and Charles Fort
 Camden Fort Meagher - a similar coastal fortification defending Cork Harbour

References

Buildings and structures in County Cork
Forts in the Republic of Ireland
Tourist attractions in County Cork
National Monuments in County Cork
Kinsale